The 2020 Men's EuroHockey Indoor Championship was the nineteenth edition of the Men's EuroHockey Indoor Championship, the biennial international men's indoor hockey championship of Europe organized by the European Hockey Federation. It took place from 17 to 19 January 2020 in Berlin, Germany.

The hosts Germany won their sixteenth title by defeating the defending champions Austria 6–3 in the final. The Netherlands won the bronze medal by defeating Russia 11–3.

Qualified teams

Format
The eight teams will be split into two groups of four teams. The top two teams advance to the semifinals to determine the winner in a knockout system. The bottom two teams play in a new group with the teams they did not play against in the group stage. The last two teams will be relegated to the EuroHockey Indoor Nations Championship II.

Results
All times are local (UTC+1).

Preliminary round
The Pools were decided in summer 2019 following the FIH Indoor World Ranking.

Pool A

Pool B

Fifth to eighth place classification

Pool C
The points obtained in the preliminary round against the other team are taken over.

First to fourth place classification

Semifinals

Third place game

Final

Final standings

See also
2020 Men's EuroHockey Indoor Championship II
2020 Women's EuroHockey Indoor Championship

References

Men's EuroHockey Indoor Championship
International indoor hockey competitions hosted by Germany
Men 1
EuroHockey Indoor Championship
Sports competitions in Berlin
EuroHockey Indoor Championship